Brad Bohannon is an American college baseball coach and former middle infielder. He is the head baseball coach at the University of Alabama. He played college baseball at Vanderbilt University in 1994 before transferring to the Georgia Institute of Technology in 1995 and finally ending up at Berry College in 1996 and 1997. In 2015, he was named the ABCA/Baseball America Assistant Coach of the Year.

Coaching career
He was announced on June 5, 2017 as the new head baseball coach at the University of Alabama.

Head coaching record

References

Living people
Alabama Crimson Tide baseball coaches
Wake Forest Demon Deacons baseball coaches
Kentucky Wildcats baseball coaches
Auburn Tigers baseball coaches
Sportspeople from Rome, Georgia
1975 births
Vanderbilt Commodores baseball players
Georgia Tech Yellow Jackets baseball players
Berry College alumni
Dubois County Dragons players